Tyrann Devine Mathieu (born May 13, 1992) is an American football safety for the New Orleans Saints of the National Football League (NFL). He played college football at LSU. In college he developed a reputation for causing turnovers, setting a Southeastern Conference (SEC) record with 11 career forced fumbles and earning the nickname "the Honey Badger" after the mammal of the same name. In his sophomore season, he was recognized as a consensus All-American, won the Chuck Bednarik Award as the best defensive player in college football, and was a finalist for the Heisman Trophy. Mathieu was dismissed from the LSU football program after that season due to a violation of team rules.

After spending a year out of football in 2012, he was drafted by the Arizona Cardinals in the third round of the 2013 NFL Draft, reuniting him in the defensive backfield with former college teammate Patrick Peterson. As a rookie he was named to the PFWA All-Rookie Team and has since earned three invitations to the Pro Bowl and has been named to the first-team All-Pro team three times. Mathieu has also played for the Houston Texans and Kansas City Chiefs, where he was a member of the team that won Super Bowl LIV.

Early years
A native of New Orleans, Louisiana, Mathieu attended St. Augustine High School, where he played for the St. Augustine Purple Knights high school football team.  He recorded 32 tackles, five interceptions, one sack and one fumble recovery as a senior.

While living in New Orleans' Central City, Mathieu was raised by his grandparents. His biological mother was absent the majority of the time and his biological father, Darrin Hayes, has been incarcerated for murder most of Mathieu's life. After his grandfather died in 1997, Mathieu was adopted by his uncle, Tyrone Mathieu, and aunt, Sheila Mathieu.

Mathieu also ran track and field for St. Augustine's track team and was a member of the relay team. He was one of the state's top performers in the long jump. He had personal-best leaps of 1.93 meters in the high jump and 7.29 meters in the long jump.

Considered a four-star recruit by Rivals.com, Mathieu was listed as the No. 13 cornerback in the nation in 2010.

College career

Mathieu accepted an athletic scholarship to attend Louisiana State University, where he played for coach Les Miles' LSU Tigers football team from 2010 to 2011.

2010 season
As a true freshman in 2010, Mathieu played in all 13 games with one start. He finished the season with 59 tackles, three sacks, and two interceptions. He was the Most Outstanding Defensive Player of the 2011 Cotton Bowl Classic against Texas A&M after he recorded seven tackles, one tackle for loss, two forced fumbles, one fumble recovery, one interception, one sack, and one pass breakup.

2011 season
At the end of the 2011 regular season, Mathieu had 77 total tackles (60 solo and 17 assists), 1.5 sacks, five forced fumbles, four fumble recoveries (two returned for a touchdown), and two interceptions. On special teams, Mathieu had 26 punt returns for 420 yards, with 2 returned for a touchdown. On October 19, 2011, Mathieu was suspended for one game following a violation of LSU's drug policy. Mathieu was named the most valuable player of the 2011 SEC Championship Game. Mathieu earned the nickname "The Honey Badger" for his tenacious ability to play extremely tough football against much larger opponents, his knack for making big plays, as well as his dyed patch of blond hair on the top of his head in his college days which resembled the blond patch of hair on the back of a honey badger.  This led to him being a Heisman Trophy finalist. On December 8, 2011, Mathieu was awarded the Chuck Bednarik Award, given to the year's best defensive player in college football.  This marked the second straight year an LSU defensive player won the nation's top defensive honor following Patrick Peterson in 2010.

2012: Dismissal
On August 10, 2012, LSU head coach Les Miles announced that Mathieu would be dismissed from the football team due to a violation of team rules. News outlets reported that the dismissal was a result of repeated drug test failures, although Miles did not confirm those reports. Mathieu had formerly expressed an interest in returning to the program for the 2013 season. On August 17, 2012, Mathieu withdrew from LSU and entered a drug rehabilitation program in Houston, Texas. Mathieu's withdrawal was expected to last for the entire 2012–2013 academic year. However, on September 4, 2012, Mathieu ended his withdrawal and enrolled for fall semester classes. On October 25, 2012, Mathieu and three other LSU former players were arrested on possession of marijuana.

On November 29, 2012, it was announced that Mathieu would enter the NFL Draft. Mathieu participated at the 2013 NFL Scouting Combine on February 26, 2013.  He ran a 4.50 40-yard dash, had 4 reps of 225 pounds, a 34-inch vertical, and a 117-inch broad jump. He also later participated at his pro day on March 27, 2013.

College statistics

Professional career
Prior to the 2012 season, Mathieu was ranked as the third best cornerback prospect in the upcoming 2013 NFL Draft by NFL analyst Chad Reuter. On November 29, 2012, Mathieu stated his intentions to enter the 2013 NFL Draft. Mathieu attended the NFL Combine and completed all of the combine and positional drills. On March 28, 2013, Mathieu attended LSU's pro day, but chose to stand on his combine numbers and only performed positional drills. He was projected to be a second or third round pick by the majority of NFL draft experts and scouts. At the conclusion of the pre-draft process, Mathieu was ranked as the tenth best cornerback prospect in the draft by DraftScout.com.

Arizona Cardinals
The Arizona Cardinals selected Mathieu in the third round (69th overall) of the 2013 NFL Draft. Mathieu was the sixth safety drafted in 2013. On April 26, 2013, it was reported that Cardinals' head coach Bruce Arians stated that Mathieu would be playing free safety although it was widely expected he would play slot cornerback coming out of college.

2013

On May 23, 2013, the Arizona Cardinals signed Mathieu to a four-year, $3.05 million contract that included $817,187 guaranteed and a signing bonus of $265,000.

Mathieu stated that he would remove himself from any association with his nickname, saying that he wants to be known as "Tyrann Mathieu" as opposed to "Honey Badger". (Over 6 years later in a week 17 postgame interview during the 2019 season, Mathieu indicated that he was satisfied that he'd established himself and was okay with the “Honey Badger” nickname.) Throughout training camp, Mathieu competed to be the first-team nickelback and starting free safety. He competed for a starting role at free safety against Yeremiah Bell and Rashad Johnson. Head coach Bruce Arians named Mathieu the backup free safety to begin the regular season, behind Rashad Johnson. Defensive coordinator Todd Bowles also named him the first-team nickelback.

He made his professional regular season debut in the Arizona Cardinals' season-opener at the St. Louis Rams and made seven solo tackles and made his first career forced fumble in their 27–24 loss. Mathieu made his first career regular season tackle and forced a fumble on St Louis Rams' tight end Jared Cook. He forced a fumble before Cook crossed into the endzone for a touchdown and it was recovered by Cardinals' linebacker Karlos Dansby for a touchback in the first quarter. The following week, he earned his first career start as a nickelback and made six solo tackles and a pass deflection during a 25–21 victory against the Detroit Lions in Week 2. On September 22, 2013, Mathieu recorded ten combined tackles (nine solo), deflected a pass, and made his first career interception during a 31–7 loss at the New Orleans Saints. Mathieu intercepted a pass by quarterback Drew Brees, that was initially intended for wide receiver Lance Moore, in the third quarter. In Week 4, Mathieu earned his first career start at free safety after Rashad Johnson sustained an injury to his finger while covering a punt the previous week. Mathieu finished the Cardinals' 13–10 win at the Tampa Bay Buccaneers in Week 4 with six solo tackles. On October 6, 2013, he recorded five solo tackles and made his first career sack during the Cardinals' 22–6 win against the Carolina Panthers. Mathieu sacked quarterback Cam Newton for a ten-yard loss in the second quarter. On December 8, 2013, Mathieu made one solo tackle and a pass deflection before exiting the Cardinals' 30–10 victory against the St. Louis Rams with a leg injury. It was later determined Mathieu tore his left ACL and LCL while returning a punt during the third quarter. On December 10, 2013, the Arizona Cardinals placed Mathieu on injured reserve officially ending his rookie season. He completed his rookie season in 2013 with 68 combined tackles (65 solo), nine pass deflections, two interceptions, a sack, and a forced fumble in 13 games and 11 starts. Mathieu was named a first-team All-Pro at the slot cornerback position by Pro Football Focus after the season.

2014
Mathieu was not able to participate in training camp due to his recovery. He was inactive for the Arizona Cardinals' season-opener, but joined the team in Week 2. Upon his return, head coach Bruce Arians named Mathieu the backup free safety behind Rashad Johnson. On September 21, 2014, Mathieu collected a season-high six combined tackles during a 23–14 win against the San Francisco 49ers. On November 2, 2014, Mathieu recorded five combined tackles, a pass deflection, and made his second career interception during a 28–17 win at the Dallas Cowboys in Week 9. In Week 10, Mathieu became the starting free safety and replaced Tony Jefferson in the starting lineup. On November 30, 2014, Mathieu made three combined tackles in the Cardinals' 29–18 loss against the Atlanta Falcons, but exited in the third quarter after sustaining a thumb injury. He underwent surgery on his thumb and was expected to miss two games (Weeks 13–14). Mathieu finished the season with 39 combined tackles (35 solo), four pass deflections, an interception, and a fumble recovery in 13 games and six starts.

2015
Defensive coordinator Todd Bowles accepted the head coaching position with the New York Jets and was replaced by James Bettcher. Throughout training camp, Mathieu competed against Rashad Johnson to be the starting free safety. Head coach Bruce Arians officially named him the starting free safety to start the regular season, alongside strong safety Deone Bucannon.

On September 27, 2015, Mathieu had a career-high two interceptions including his first career touchdown against the San Francisco 49ers. The last time an Arizona Cardinal had two interceptions in a game was Patrick Peterson in Week 10, 2014. He had two more interceptions in 2015 before his season-ending injury, one in November 15 against the Seattle Seahawks and on November 29 against the 49ers. On December 20, against the Philadelphia Eagles, Mathieu tore his right ACL after an interception, causing him to miss the final two games of the regular season in addition to the post-season. Mathieu was named to his first Pro bowl after the season and was named by the Associated Press as a first-team All-Pro safety. He was ranked 28th by his fellow players on the NFL Top 100 Players of 2016.

2016

On August 2, 2016, the Arizona Cardinals signed Mathieu to a five-year, $62.5 million extension that included $21.25 million guaranteed and a signing bonus of $15.5 million. On October 17, he picked off Geno Smith, his ninth career interception against the New York Jets. In Week 8 against the Carolina Panthers, Mathieu left the game with a shoulder injury. He was ruled out from three to six weeks. He played in two of the next six games, struggling in both of the games. He was placed on injured reserve on December 23, 2016.

2017
On September 17, 2017, Mathieu picked off Jacoby Brissett in overtime in a 16–13 victory over the Indianapolis Colts. The pick set the Cardinals up to win the game on a Phil Dawson field goal. Overall, Mathieu finished the 2017 season with 78 total tackles, two interceptions, one forced fumble and one sack.

On March 14, 2018, Mathieu was released by the Cardinals after refusing to take a pay cut.

Houston Texans
On March 17, 2018, Mathieu signed a one-year contract with the Houston Texans worth $7 million. In his first game with the Texans, against the New England Patriots, Mathieu had one interception, recovered a fumble, and had five tackles. He finished the season with 89 combined tackles, three sacks, eight passes defensed and two interceptions.

Kansas City Chiefs

2019
On March 14, 2019, Mathieu signed a three-year, $42 million contract with the Kansas City Chiefs. Overall, Mathieu finished the 2019 season with 75 total tackles, four interceptions, 12 passes defended, and two sacks. On February 2, 2020, Mathieu won Super Bowl LIV when the Chiefs defeated the San Francisco 49ers 31–20.

2020
In a Week 4 26–10 victory over the New England Patriots, Mathieu returned an interception 25 yards for a touchdown, his first defensive touchdown as a member of the Chiefs and the second in his career.
In Week 13 against the Denver Broncos on Sunday Night Football, Mathieu intercepted two passes thrown by Drew Lock.  His second interception of the game occurred late in the fourth quarter and secured a 22–16 win for the Chiefs. Overall, Mathieu finished the 2020 season with 62 total tackles, nine passes defended, one fumble recovery, and a career-high six interceptions.

In the Divisional Round of the playoffs against the Cleveland Browns, Mathieu intercepted a pass thrown by Baker Mayfield during the 22–17 win.
In Super Bowl LV against the Tampa Bay Buccaneers, Mathieu recorded three tackles during the 9–31 loss. During the game, Mathieu got in a verbal altercation with Buccaneers' quarterback Tom Brady and tweeted that Brady "called me something I won't repeat" after the game. Mathieu later removed the tweet. Brady was mic’d up during said altercation, but the NFL refused to release the audio.

2021
On September 1, 2021, Mathieu tested positive for COVID-19 and was placed on the COVID-19 reserve list. He was activated off the COVID-19 reserve list on September 11. However, the Chiefs put him on the inactive list for the Chiefs week 1 game against the Cleveland Browns.

New Orleans Saints
On May 4, 2022, Mathieu signed a three-year, $33 million contract with his hometown team, the New Orleans Saints.

NFL career statistics

References

External links

 
 Kansas City Chiefs bio
 Arizona Cardinals bio
 LSU Tigers bio 

1992 births
Living people
Players of American football from New Orleans
American football cornerbacks
American football safeties
St. Augustine High School (New Orleans) alumni
LSU Tigers football players
All-American college football players
Arizona Cardinals players
Houston Texans players
Kansas City Chiefs players
New Orleans Saints players
Unconferenced Pro Bowl players
American Conference Pro Bowl players
Ed Block Courage Award recipients